Lloyd Michael Sherr (born February 28, 1956), also known by his stage name Max Raphael, is an American voice actor. He is best known for his role as Fillmore in the Cars franchise, taking over the role from George Carlin since his death in 2008, as well as his former role as narrator of the History Channel series Modern Marvels.

Career
Sherr has been credited in many forms of media, most notably as narrator of the History Channel show Modern Marvels, for which his voice has become a trademark of the History Channel. Sherr (credited as Raphael) has also narrated other History Channel series such as Command Decisions, Engineering Disasters, and Dogfights.

He is known for voice-over work in various video games, such as Cronos in God of War II, bounty-hunter Calo Nord in Star Wars: Knights of the Old Republic, Diego in Gothic 3 and EverQuest II.

One of Mr. Sherr's most notable roles was The Moper in the 1984 classic 'Revenge of the Nerds'. Sherr played a man who was currently being held on a charge of mopery, which is exposing oneself to a blind person.

On television, he performed the roles of Vathek in W.I.T.C.H., Jibolba in the Nickelodeon series Tak and the Power of Juju, Everett in Back at the Barnyard, Father in Star Wars: The Clone Wars, and the Narrator in Random! Cartoons. He has also voiced narration for videos produced by Scientology regarding Thetan existence, and the 8 dynamics. Sherr is also the voice of Fillmore in the Cars franchise, in place of George Carlin, who died of heart failure in 2008.

He also voiced Fillmore in Cars 2 and Cars 3. In Cars 2: The Video Game and Disney Infinity, Sherr reprised his role as Fillmore.

Sherr's stage name is a combination of his children's names, Max and Raphael (as listed on his website).

Sherr has also performed voice acting work for several Scientology productions.

Filmography

Film

Television

Video games

Live-action

Theme park attractions

References
8. Dianetics Audiofile Magazine March 2004.

External links

History Channel's official Modern Marvels site

1956 births
Living people
American male voice actors
American male film actors
American male stage actors
American male television actors
American male video game actors
Male actors from Los Angeles